Hansjörg Farbmacher (20 September 1940 – 14 March 1982) was an Austrian skier. He competed at the 1964 Winter Olympics and the 1968 Winter Olympics.

References

External links
 

1940 births
1982 deaths
Austrian male biathletes
Austrian male cross-country skiers
Olympic biathletes of Austria
Olympic cross-country skiers of Austria
Biathletes at the 1964 Winter Olympics
Cross-country skiers at the 1964 Winter Olympics
Cross-country skiers at the 1968 Winter Olympics
Sportspeople from Innsbruck
20th-century Austrian people